Soziedad Alkoholika (Alcoholic Society), commonly abbreviated to S.A., is a crossover thrash band from the Basque Country in Spain. They were founded in Vitoria-Gasteiz in 1988. Their lyrics tend to have a crude, direct and somewhat emotional approach to politics and, among others, deal with issues such as: militarism, fascism, racism, sexism, state violence and monarchy.

Over the years S.A. has become a controversial and yet successful band with considerable impact in the underground Spanish and Latin American punk and metal scenes.

From 2002 to 2006 the band was repeatedly accused by Asociación de Víctimas del Terrorismo (AVT) and other right-wing groups of glorifying ETA´s terrorism,. They were ultimately acquitted of all charges, but as a consequence of this controversy, S.A. has been banned by some conservative local governments from playing in several places in Spain, Madrid being one of them.

Soziedad Alkoholika denounces the lack of freedom and the existing state oppression in the Basque Country, defends the right to self-determination and advocates for the dismantlement of the Basque Police Forces Ertzaintza. It also calls for the independence of the Basque Country, opposes animal testing and supports the Palestinian cause against the State of Israel.

Members 
Juan Aceña – vocals (1988–present)
Jimmy – guitar (1988–present)
Pirulo – bass (1996–present)
Iñigo Zubizarreta – guitar (2009–present)
Alfred Berengena – drums (2014–present)

Past members 
Roberto Castresana – drums (1988–2014)
Iñaki Bengoa – bass (1988–1996)
Oskar – guitar (1988–1990)
Pedro – guitar (1990–1997)
Javi García – guitar (1998-2009)

Discography

Videos

References

External links
Official website 

Musical groups established in 1988
Crossover thrash groups
Spanish hardcore punk groups
Spanish thrash metal musical groups
Rock en Español music groups
Basque music bands